Glenbert Croes (born on 17 June 2001), known as Glenbert, is an Aruban professional footballer who plays as a striker/attacking midfielder for Aruban Division di Honor club Nacional and for the Aruba national team.

He debuted internationally in his youth career in his U20 team in a match against Grenada and scored his goal for his youth team in a 0–3 victory the 2018 CONCACAF U-20 Championship in the United States.

He made his senior debut on 22 March 2019 in a 3–2 defeat against St. Lucia in the CONCACAF Nations League qualifying rounds, securing their spot to League B.

On 15 November 2019, Croes scored his first senior goal for Aruba with a 4–2 defeat to Guyana.

Croes joined RCA as an under-14, became the club's youngest ever first-team player when he made his senior debut in May 2016, at the age of 14 years, 307 days in the Aruban Division di Honor 2015-16 playoffs.

Nacional 
On 25 January 2023, he finished second in the Copa Betico Croes with Nacional losing 0–1 to Britannia.

International career

International goals
Scores and results list Aruba's goal tally first.

References

2001 births
Living people
Aruban footballers
Aruba international footballers
Association football defenders
SV Racing Club Aruba players